Oulactis is a genus of sea anemones in the family Actiniidae, found in the intertidal zone. It contains the following species:
Oulactis cincta (Stuckey, 1909)
Oulactis coliumensis (Riemann-Zürneck & Gallardo, 1990)
Oulactis concinnata (Drayton in Dana, 1846)
Oulactis magna (Stuckey, 1909)
Oulactis mcmurrichi (Lager, 1911)
Oulactis muscosa (Drayton in Dana, 1846)
Oulactis orientalis (Averincev, 1967)

References

Actiniidae
Hexacorallia genera